Nordkurier is a German language newspaper published in Neubrandenburg, Germany. The paper is the continuation of Freie Erde which was published in the German Democratic Republic.

History and profile

Nordkurier was first published on 2 April 1990 as the successor of Freie Erde. The paper is published by Kurierverlags GmbH & Co KG from Mondays to Saturdays. The headquarters of the paper is in Neubrandenburg. It has 14 editions which are distributed in east Mecklenburg, the southern regions of West Pomerania and in Uckermark, north Brandenburg.

References

External links
 Official website

1990 establishments in Germany
German-language newspapers
Newspapers published in Germany
Publications established in 1990
Neubrandenburg